The Rettendon murders (also known as the Range Rover murders or Essex murders) occurred on 6 December 1995 in the village of Rettendon in Essex, England, when three drug dealers were shot dead in a Range Rover on a small farm track. The murders were the subject of a major police investigation and various special operations, including Operation Century, which were undertaken to uncover the perpetrators and as many other details as possible. The murders have also been the subject of books and feature films.

Triple murders

On 6 December 1995, drug dealers Tony Tucker (38), Patrick Tate (37) and Craig Rolfe (26) were shot dead in a Range Rover on a small farm track in Rettendon. The bodies of the three men were found the following morning by farmer Peter Theobald and his friend Ken Jiggins.

Police investigation

A police investigation codenamed Operation Century produced no arrests or evidence leading to a criminal prosecution. A prosecution that was eventually brought in connection with the murders was based on police operations subsequent to the closure of Operation Century.

Two men, Jack Arthur Whomes of Brockford, Suffolk, and Michael John Steele of Great Bentley, Colchester, were convicted of the murders on 20 January 1998 after an Old Bailey trial, and sentenced to life imprisonment. The key witness was police informer Darren Nicholls from Braintree, Essex, who gave evidence against his former friends at their trial. Questions were raised over the reliability of mobile phone records used to corroborate the informant's testimony. Over the last two decades the pair have unsuccessfully challenged their convictions.

On 25 January 2021, after a Parole Board hearing, it was announced that Jack Whomes would be released from prison on licence after serving 23 years. His 25 year sentence was reduced by two years in 2018 due to his exemplary conduct whilst incarcerated.

During the investigation it was suggested that the murders may have been linked to the death of Leah Betts who died after taking an ecstasy tablet.

Films
The following films are based, to varying degrees, on the crime:

 Essex Boys (2000)
 Rise of the Footsoldier (2007)
 Bonded by Blood (2010)
 The Fall of the Essex Boys (2013)
 Essex Boys: Retribution (2013)
 Rise of the Footsoldier II: Reign of the General (2015)
 Essex Boys: Law of Survival (2015)
 Bonded by Blood 2 (2017)
 Rise of the Footsoldier 3: Pat Tate Story (2017)
 Rise of the Footsoldier 4: Marbella (2019)
 Rise of the Footsoldier 5: Origins (2021)

See also
 List of criminal enterprises, gangs and syndicates
 Major crimes in the United Kingdom
 Murders of Harry and Megan Tooze – infamous shooting murders in Wales in 1993

References

Further reading
 Leach, Carlton (2003). Muscle. Blake Publishing. 
 
 O'Mahoney, Bernard (2006). Bonded by Blood: Murder and Intrigue in the Essex Ganglands. 
 Rugby, Ken and Thompson, Tony (2000). Bloggs 19: The Story of the Essex Range Rover Triple Murders. Sphere.

External links
 BBC: The Essex murders

1995 in England
1995 murders in the United Kingdom
1990s in Essex
1990s trials
City of Chelmsford
Deaths by firearm in England
December 1995 crimes
December 1995 events in the United Kingdom
Murder in Essex
Murder trials
Murdered British gangsters
Organised crime events in the United Kingdom
Organised crime in England
People murdered by British organized crime
Trials in London
Violent non-state actor incidents in the United Kingdom